We Are Okay is a young adult novel by Nina LaCour, published February 14, 2017 by Dutton Books for Young Readers.

Reception 
We Are Okay received starred reviews from Booklist, Kirkus, Publishers Weekly, Shelf Awareness, and School Library Journal, as well as a positive review from Horn Book Guide.

Kirkus called the book "An elegantly crafted paean to the cleansing power of truth," and Booklist called it "[r]aw and beautiful." The Washington Post named it one of nine influential young adult novels over the past 50 years, placing it alongside Harry Potter, The Outsiders, and The Hunger Games.

TIME added the book to its "100 Best Young Adult Books of All Time" list, and Bustle named it one of the best books of the decade. The Boston Globe,Publishers Weekly, and Seventeen named it one of the best books of the year.

The audiobook, narrated by Jorjeana Marie, received a starred review from School Library Journal, who stated that Marie "conveys the depth of Marin's moodiness, introspection, and confusion... [A]s Marin grows stronger, so does Marie's voice for her." Booklist also provided a positive review, noting that "Marie’s heartfelt reading enlivens the story and wrings meaning out of each word."

References 

2010s LGBT novels
2017 LGBT-related literary works
Novels set in San Francisco
Novels set in New York (state)
Dutton Children's Books books